Scey-sur-Saône-et-Saint-Albin (literally Scey on Saône and Saint-Albin) is a commune in the Haute-Saône department in the region of Bourgogne-Franche-Comté in eastern France.

History 
Murder victim Céline Figard is buried in the commune.

See also
Communes of the Haute-Saône department

References

Communes of Haute-Saône